Shiquan County is a county in the south Shaanxi province, China. It is under the administration of the prefecture-level city of Ankang.

Administrative divisions
As 2019, Shiquan County is divided to 11 towns.
Towns

Climate

Transportation
China National Highway 210
China National Highway 316
Yangpingguan–Ankang Railway

References

External links
Official website of Shiquan County Government

County-level divisions of Shaanxi
Ankang